Banna GAA was a hurling club from North County Kerry, Ireland. They won one Kerry Senior Hurling Championship in 1940 when they beat Dingle in the final on a scoreline of 5-03 to 2-03. The club was eventually disbanded after they combined with Ardfert to create St Brendan's Hurling Club in the 1960s.

County Championship Winning Captains
 1940: Johnny Hussey

Former Gaelic Athletic Association clubs in Kerry
Gaelic games clubs in County Kerry
Hurling clubs in County Kerry